Magalie Poisson (born 9 March 1982) is a French rhythmic gymnast. She represented France at the Olympic Games in 2000

Career 
She competed as an individual at the junior european championship in 1995, before being incorporated into the group in 1998. 
In 2000 Poisson was selected as a member of the French group to compete at the Olympic Games held in Sydney, Australia. They scored 37.900 points in the qualifying round with teammates Anna-Sofie Doyen, Anne-Laure Klein, Anne-Sophie Lavoine, Laetitia Mancieri and Vanessa Sauzede. They finished in ninth place after qualification, not managing to reach the final.

References

External links

1982 births
Living people
French rhythmic gymnasts
Olympic gymnasts of France
Gymnasts at the 2000 Summer Olympics